Kumbazha is a main junction in the Pathanmthitta Municipality Pathanamthitta City Suburbs, located in Kerala state, India. The Achenkovil river flows through Kumbazha. The Thiruvalla - Kumbazha (SH-7) road, also known as the T.K road, ends at Kumbazha.

Here is the map of Kumbazha :	Click Me To View The Map

Location
Kumbazha Jn. is 3 km away from Pathanamthitta Central Jn. It is the meeting point of two major state highways, T.K.Road (SH - 07) and Main Eastern Highway (Punalur-Pathanamthitta-Muvattupuzha Road / SH - 08).

Temples
Kumbazha is the gateway to the Malayalappuzha Devi Temple. Valanchuzhy temple, St. Mary's Orthodox Valiya Cathedral and St. Simeon's Cathedral are the main pilgrim centres in Kumbazha.

Churches
Kumbazha is also a home to many Christians, churches can be found almost in every corner of Kumbazha. Kumbazha Valiya Cathedral is the main attraction of the town because of holy Remains Tomp of St Thomas & Skintho Yukno of Mother Mary.

Festivals
Samyuktha Christmas aaghosham (celebration in English) is conducted every year on 25 December, participated in by people of various religions. The 40th consecutive festival conducted in 2018.

See also 
 Pathanamthitta District
 Main Eastern Highway

References 

Villages in Pathanamthitta district